The women's double sculls competition at the 2016 Summer Olympics in Rio de Janeiro was held on 6–11 August at the Lagoon Rodrigo de Freitas.

The medals for the competition were presented by Nenad Lalović, Serbia, member of the International Olympic Committee, and the gifts were presented by Lenka Dientsbach-Wech, Germany, Member of the Executive Committee of the International Rowing Federation.

Results

Heats
First three of each heat qualify to the semifinals, remainder goes to the repechage.

Heat 1

Heat 2

Heat 3

Repechage
First three of heat qualify to the semifinals.

Heat 1

Semifinals
First three of each heat qualify to the Final A, remainder goes to the Final B.

Semifinal 1

Semifinal 2

Final

Final B

Final A

References

Women's double sculls
Women's events at the 2016 Summer Olympics